Bejjeh is a municipality in the Byblos District of  Keserwan-Jbeil Governorate, Lebanon. It is 54 kilometers north of Beirut. Bejjeh has an average elevation of 560 meters above sea level and a total land area of 502 hectares. There were four companies with more than five employees operating in the village as of 2008. Its inhabitants are predominantly Maronite Catholics.

This village is of great historical value for the Maronite community. After centuries of exile in the Qadisha Valley, the Maronites decided to take back their land. They chose to settle in Bejjeh first, before they continue their expansion over the whole Mount-Lebanon and the current Lebanese territory. Multiple Maronite families passed through Bejjeh at some point of their History, hence the famous Lebanese saying « Bejjeh and Maad are the two thirds of the country» (بجة ومعاد ثلثين البلاد). Bejjeh is known for its seven emblematic hills and its ten beautiful churches. It has the finest olive oil and arak, and delicious figs and grapes. 

« The two thirds of the country » (ثلثين البلاد), « the center of the world » (نص الكون), « heart of the mountain » (قلب الجبل) are some of the most renown slogans of the village, mainly expressing the pride of its inhabitants.

References

Populated places in Byblos District
Maronite Christian communities in Lebanon